Samuel Sarphati (31 January 1813 – 23 June 1866) was a Dutch physician and Amsterdam city planner.

Biography 
Sarphati's ancestors were Spanish and Portuguese Jews who arrived in the Netherlands in the 17th century. Though middle-class, his parents were able to let him attend a Latin school. At the age of 20, Sarphati started studying medicine in Leiden, which he finished with a promotion in 1839.

During his work thereafter as a doctor in Amsterdam (he lived at the house #598 Herengracht), Sarphati encountered the bad hygiene among the poor in Amsterdam. His compassion for his patients led him to initiate several projects to improve the quality of life in the city and the health of its inhabitants. This included a bread factory producing wholesome, affordable bread, and a refuse collection service.

Sarphati played an important role in the initiation of waste transport in 1847. He became involved in politics, particularly as a project developer in city planning. Beside public health, he initiated improvements in education and industrialization. He wanted to enhance Amsterdam's dignity and standing by constructing impressive buildings like the Amstel Hotel and the Paleis voor Volksvlijt.

After his death, Sarphatipark in Amsterdam was designed and named after him in 1885.

The Sarphati Sanitation Awards have been named in his honour.

Buildings built on Sarphati's initiative 
The first trade school
A bread factory (Maatschappij voor Meel-en-Broodfabrieken)
Palace of National Industry (Paleis voor Volksvlijt), destroyed by fire in 1929
InterContinental Amstel Amsterdam (Amstel Hotel)

References

External links 

 Palace of National Industry
  Sarphati in "Biografisch Portaal"

1813 births
1866 deaths
19th-century Sephardi Jews
Dutch Sephardi Jews
Spanish and Portuguese Jews
Dutch people of Portuguese-Jewish descent
Dutch public health doctors
Jewish physicians
Physicians from Amsterdam